Robert Juckel (born ) is a German male artistic gymnast, representing his nation at international competitions. He participated at the 2004 Summer Olympics and 2008 Summer Olympics. He won the bronze medal in the team event at the 2007 World Artistic Gymnastics Championships.

References

1981 births
Living people
German male artistic gymnasts
Place of birth missing (living people)
Gymnasts at the 2008 Summer Olympics
Gymnasts at the 2004 Summer Olympics
Olympic gymnasts of Germany